The 2015 Manny V. Pangilinan Cup, also known as the Master Game Face MVP Cup 2015 due to sponsorship reasons, was an invitational basketball tournament which was contested by four teams from September 11–13, 2015 at the Smart Araneta Coliseum. While a similarly named tournament was held in 2010, the 2010 MVP Invitational Champions' Cup, the 2015 MVP Cup is considered the inaugural edition of the MVP Cup and is planned to be held annually.

The tournament was a single-round robin format and the champions were awarded $25,000.

Venue

Participants
 (hosts)

 Wellington Saints
 Talk 'N Text

China, South Korea and Senegal were invited to join the tournament but neither three had confirmed their participation. Lebanon confirmed their participation but later withdrew from the tournament due to undisclosed reasons. Talk 'N Text Tropang Texters was a last minute replacement team following the withdrawal of Lebanon.

Results

Standings

|}

Awards

References

2015
2015–16 in Philippine basketball
2015 in New Zealand basketball
2015 in Taiwanese sport
Sport in Quezon City